"Heavenward Grand Prix" is the third 7" single by Canadian rock duo Japandroids. It was released by Polyvinyl Record Co. on November 16, 2010. The initial pressing was limited to 2000 copies on clear vinyl. It is currently out-of-print.

Track listing

 "Heavenward Grand Prix" - 3:55
 "Shame" (PJ Harvey cover) - 2:18

References 

2010 singles
Japandroids songs
2010 songs
Polyvinyl Record Co. singles